The 5th Lambda Literary Awards were held in 1993 to honour works of LGBT literature published in 1992.

Special awards

Nominees and winners

External links
 5th Lambda Literary Awards

05
Lambda
Lists of LGBT-related award winners and nominees
1993 in LGBT history
1993 awards in the United States